In Luxembourg, a grade system from 01 to 60 is used in secondary schools. A grade of at least 30 is required to pass. An insufficient mark (01-29) is called a Datz in Luxembourgish. The grades are distributed in the following way:

Grading at the University of Luxembourg instead operates with a French-style 20-point scale, with a minimum score of 10/20 required to pass.

Luxembourg
Grading
Grading